The American Constitution Society (ACS) is a progressive legal organization with over 200 chapters across American law schools. 

Founded in 2001 following to the U.S. Supreme Court decision Bush v. Gore, ACS is headquartered in Washington, D.C. The organization promotes and facilitates discussion and debate of progressive public policy ideas and issues, providing forums for legal scholars, lawmakers, judges, lawyers, public policy advocates, law students, and members of the media. ACS reports that it has approximately 200 law school student chapters and 40 lawyer chapters around the country. The group's stated mission is to "promote the vitality of the U.S. Constitution and the fundamental values it expresses: individual rights and liberties, genuine equality, access to justice, democracy and the rule of law."

History

ACS was created as a counterweight to, and is modeled as a parallel to, the Federalist Society, and is often described as its progressive counterpart.

The American Constitution Society was founded in 2001 by Peter Rubin, a Georgetown Law School professor who served as counsel to Al Gore in the legal battle over the 2000 election. The group was originally known as the Madison Society for Law and Policy. The organization was formed as a counterweight to the conservative Federalist Society. It was founded in order to build a network of progressive lawyers and foster new avenues of progressive legal thought. ACS received its initial funding from the William and Flora Hewlett Foundation. The Democracy Alliance lists ACS as a recommended funding recipient.

Board of directors
Members of the organization's board of directors have included David Halperin, a speechwriter in the Bill Clinton administration who also served as the organization's founding executive director from 2001 to 2003; and Eric Holder, former Attorney General of the United States. Among the organization's former  board chairs is California Supreme Court Judge Goodwin Liu.

Activities
ACS hosts press and Capitol Hill briefings and public policy debates as well as an annual convention where an array of legal and public policy issues are discussed and debated.

The organization disseminates ACS Issue Briefs, the ACSBlog, a journal titled Harvard Law and Policy Review, and Advance: The Journal of the ACS Issue Groups.

In 2008, ACS's executive director, Lisa Brown, went on leave to serve on the Barack Obama transition team. She headed the president-elect's agency review team and later served as the first White House Staff Secretary in the Obama White House.

In 2009, ACS published Keeping Faith with the Constitution by Pamela S. Karlan, Goodwin Liu, and Christopher H. Schroeder. It was re-issued by Oxford University Press in 2010. The book serves as a primer for progressives interested in promoting liberal constitutionalism.

Since 2009, ACS has given an annual award to a rising star in public interest law named in memory of David Carliner. The Carliner award comes with a $10,000 prize for the winner, plus money for the winner's organization and for a finalist.

On November 14, 2018, the American Constitution Society released a letter signed by over 1,600 attorneys nationwide calling for lawmakers and Justice Department officials to protect the special counsel's Russia probe in light of Matthew Whitaker's appointment as acting attorney general. The signatories call for Whitaker to recuse himself or "otherwise be removed from overseeing the Mueller investigation as a result of his profound ethical conflicts."

See also
 Alliance for Justice
 Brennan Center for Justice
 Justice at Stake
 National Lawyers Guild

References

External links
 Official website
 JudicialNominations.org

Non-profit organizations based in Washington, D.C.
Organizations established in 2001
2001 establishments in the United States
Progressive organizations in the United States
Legal organizations based in the United States